James Elvin Wagner (1873–1969) was a U.S. clergyman. The last president of the Evangelical and Reformed Church, Wagner served as the first co-president of the United Church of Christ from 1957 until 1961. His Congregational Christian counterpart was the Rev. Fred Hoskins.

1873 births
1969 deaths
United Church of Christ members
United Church of Christ ministers
Knights Commander of the Order of Merit of the Federal Republic of Germany